Purbeck may refer to:

 Isle of Purbeck, a peninsula in the English county of Dorset
 Purbeck Mineral and Mining Museum
 Purbeck District, a local government district in the English county of Dorset
 Purbeck Hills, a range of hills in the English county of Dorset
 Purbeck stone
 Purbeck Marble, a stone found on the Isle of Purbeck
 Purbeck Ball Clay, a ball clay found on the Isle of Purbeck
 Purbeck Group, a sequence of rock strata